Elsaid Maher Taher Mohamed (born 4 March 1991), is an Egyptian footballer who currently plays as a forward for Al Qazzazin.

Club career
Having played for Al Masry, Al Ittihad, El Dakhleya and Telecom Egypt, all in his native Egypt, Maher moved to Jordan in 2015 to sign for Dar Al Dawa. On his return to Egypt, he spent two seasons with Egyptian Second Division side Kahraba Talkha, before a shock move to Finland with Veikkausliiga club HIFK in 2019.

After three appearances with HIFK, Maher again returned to Egypt, signing with Beni Ebeid in November 2020. He would spend two seasons in the Egyptian Second Division, the second with Gomhoriat Shebin, before a move to Egyptian Third Division side Al Qazzazin in September 2022.

International career
Maher represented Egypt at the 2019 Socca World Cup.

Career statistics

Club

References

1991 births
Living people
Egyptian footballers
Association football midfielders
Association football forwards
Egyptian Second Division players
Veikkausliiga players
Al Masry SC players
Al Ittihad Alexandria Club players
El Dakhleya SC players
HIFK Fotboll players
Beni Ebeid SC players
Gomhoriat Shebin SC players
Egyptian expatriate footballers
Egyptian expatriate sportspeople in Jordan
Expatriate footballers in Jordan
Expatriate footballers in Finland